Spirocercidae is a family of nematodes belonging to the order Spirurida.

Genera

Genera:
 Ascarops van Beneden, 1873
 Cyathospirura Baylis, 1934
 Didelphonema Wolfgang, 1953

References

Nematodes